Ramón Luis Franco (born September 12, 1963) is a film and television actor. He was born in Caguas, Puerto Rico and resides in Los Angeles.

Franco is most well known for his role in the Vietnam Series Tour of Duty where he played Alberto Ruiz. He also appeared in Clint Eastwood's movie Heartbreak Ridge in 1986 as Lance Corporal Aponte. He appeared in the TV series The Bridge as Mexican cartel leader Fausto Galván.  He also appeared in an episode of Miami Vice as Bustos, one of Esteban Revilla's drug cartel members in the season 2 opener The Prodigal Son.

Filmography

References

External links

1968 births
Living people
People from Caguas, Puerto Rico
Puerto Rican male actors